is a private university in Suminoe-ku, Osaka, Japan, established in 2007.

External links
 Official website 

Educational institutions established in 2007
Private universities and colleges in Japan
Universities and colleges in Osaka
2007 establishments in Japan